Kyle Reyes (born October 10, 1993) is a Canadian judoka who competes in the men's 100 kg category. Reyes was born in Brampton, Ontario, Canada.

Reyes won the gold medal the 2013 World Junior Championships in Ljubljana, became the first Canadian judoka to win a World Junior Championships gold medal.

In June 2016, he was named to Canada's Olympic team.

While born in Brampton, he was raised in Toronto.

See also
 Judo in Ontario
Judo in Canada
List of Canadian judoka

References

External links
 
 
 
 Kyle Reyes at Judo Canada (archived)

Canadian male judoka
1993 births
Living people
Sportspeople from Toronto
Judoka at the 2016 Summer Olympics
Olympic judoka of Canada
Judoka at the 2022 Commonwealth Games
Commonwealth Games silver medallists for Canada
21st-century Canadian people
Commonwealth Games medallists in judo
Medallists at the 2022 Commonwealth Games